"Star" was the second Kevin Ayers single issued to promote his 1976 album, Yes We Have No Mañanas (So Get Your Mañanas Today). Both songs were featured on the LP. Ayers would not release another single in the UK for three years.

Track listing
"Star" (Kevin Ayers)
"The Owl" (Kevin Ayers)

Personnel
Kevin Ayers / Guitar, Vocals
Billy Livsey / Keyboards
Charlie McCracken / Bass 
Ollie Halsall /Guitar 
Rob Townsend / Drums, percussion 
Roger Saunders Guitar
B.J. Cole / Steel Guitar

References

Kevin Ayers songs
1977 singles
Songs written by Kevin Ayers
Song recordings produced by Muff Winwood
1977 songs
Harvest Records singles